Four the Record is the fourth studio album by American country music singer and songwriter Miranda Lambert. It was released on November 1, 2011, by RCA Records Nashville. This was her first studio album to be released from that label after a corporate reconstructing at Sony Music Nashville.

The album was a widespread critical success and the highest-charting record of Lambert's career at the time, reaching number three on the Billboard 200. It eventually sold over one million copies in the United States. A deluxe edition of the album was also released, which included a bonus song and a DVD.

Writing and recording 
Lambert wrote or co-wrote six of the album's tracks. It was recorded in sessions at Jupiter Studios in Seattle, Sugarhill Recording Studios in Houston, The Cave in Dallas, Wincraft Music Studios in England, and the Nashville-based studios Ronnie's Place, Sound Stage Studios, and Tragedy/Tragedy Studios.

Release and promotion
Lambert announced in July 2011 that Four the Record would be released on November 1, 2011. A month later, Sony Music Nashville announced that Lambert and labelmate Josh Thompson would transfer to RCA Nashville as part of a corporate restructuring.

In the first week of release, the album sold 133,000 copies in the United States and debuted at number three on the Billboard 200, making it the highest-charting album of Lambert's career at that time. It also debuted at number one on the Billboard Top Country Albums. The album was certified platinum by the Recording Industry Association of America on January 10, 2014, and by September of that year, it had sold 1,014,000 copies in the US.

Critical reception 

Four the Record was met with widespread critical acclaim. At Metacritic, which assigns a normalized rating out of 100 to reviews from mainstream publications, the album received an average score of 83, based on 12 reviews. Stephen Thomas Erlewine from AllMusic believed Lambert was able to expand stylistically by relying more on other songwriters for the record: "She's digging deeper than ever before and finding considerable riches." In Country Weekly, Ken Tucker deemed it her best album so far and hailed Lambert as a matured "interpreter of songs, whether she's written them or not", while Genevieve Koski from The A.V. Club felt it showcased some of her most intriguing songs yet, proving "her willingness to color outside the lines of country-music convention goes beyond lyrical statements of bad-assitude." Entertainment Weekly critic Mikael Wood said she explored a variety of human emotions and moods on the record, which he called her "most vivid effort yet, with brilliantly observed songs about lust ('Fine Tune') and disappointment ('Same Old You'), as well as a stirring celebration of diversity ('All Kinds of Kinds')."

Some reviewers were less enthusiastic. Writing for MSN Music, Robert Christgau called Four the Record a "basic quality country album" highlighted by the harder opening songs before delving into trite ballads catering to the housewife demographic, such as "Dear Diamond", "Oklahoma Sky", and "Better in the Long Run". Spin magazine's Theon Weber lamented most of the lyrics, which he found "flat, even when they're Lambert's", while Jon Caramanica of The New York Times viewed it as a foray into alternative country featuring some of her least inspired singing and songwriting.

Track listing

Personnel
Credits are adapted from AllMusic.

Musicians 

 Richard Bennett – guitar, bouzouki (13) 
 Sarah Buxton – background vocals (tracks 4, 10)
 Brandi Carlile – background vocals (7)
Matt Chamberlain – drums, percussion
 Glen Duncan – background vocals (2)
 Karen Fairchild – background vocals (11)
 Don Henry – background vocals (1)
John Barlow Jarvis – piano
 Jay Joyce – guitar, clavinet (8), slide acoustic (8), pump organ (1)
 Josh Kelley – background vocals (8)
 Miranda Lambert – lead vocals
 Greg Leisz – dobro, steel guitar
 Betsey Long – background vocals (3)
 Patty Loveless – background vocals (6)
 Allison Moorer – background vocals (14)
 Gordon Mote – background vocals (2)
 Kacey Musgraves – background vocals (5)
 Stoney LaRue – background vocals (1)
 Kimberly Schlapman – background vocals (11)
 Randy Scruggs – background vocals (2, 9)
 Blake Shelton – duet vocals (12)
 Chris Stapleton – background vocals (13)
 Scotty Wray – background vocals (9)
 Randy Scruggs – banjo, guitar, mandolin
 Steve Winwood – B-3 Organ (8)
 Glenn Worf – bass guitar, upright bass, Picked piano (6), background vocals (2)

Production 

 Chuck Ainlay – engineering, mixing, producer
 Enzo Angileri – hair stylist
 Judy Forde-Blair – creative producer, liner notes
 Steven Christensen – vocal recording
 Tammie Harris Cleek – imaging, photo production
 Martin Feveyear – vocal recording
 Tracy Baskette-Fleaner – creative director, design
 Tiffany Gifford – stylist
 Emory Gordy, Jr. – vocal recording
 Brittany Hamlin – production coordination
 Ryan Krieg – assistant engineer, mixing assistant
 Frank Liddell – producer
 Stephen Marcussen – mastering
 Mylah Morales – make-up
 Randee St. Nicholas – photography
 Lisa Ramsey-Perkins – A&R
 Brandon Schexnayder – assistant engineer, mixing assistant
 James Towler – engineering
 Stewart Whitmore – digital editing
 Glenn Worf – producer

Charts

Weekly charts

Year-end charts

Certifications

References

External links 
 

2011 albums
Miranda Lambert albums
RCA Records albums
Albums produced by Chuck Ainlay
Albums produced by Frank Liddell